The 2019–20 Robert Morris Colonials men's basketball team represented Robert Morris University during the 2019–20 NCAA Division I men's basketball season. The Colonials, led by tenth-year head coach Andrew Toole, played their home games at the UPMC Events Center in Moon Township, Pennsylvania as members of the Northeast Conference. They finished the season 20–15, 13–5 in NEC play to finish in a tie for second place. They defeated St. Francis Brooklyn, LIU and Saint Francis (PA) to be champions of the NEC tournament. They earned the NEC's automatic bid before the tournament was cancelled due to the COVID-19 pandemic.

On June 15, 2020, Robert Morris announced that this would be the last season for the team in the NEC as they will join the Horizon League on July 1, 2020.

Previous season
The Colonials finished the 2018–19 season 18–17, 11–7 in NEC play to finish in  fourth place. As the No. 4 seed in the NEC tournament, they defeated No. 5 seed St. Francis Brooklyn in the quarterfinals before losing in the semifinals to No. 2 seed Fairleigh Dickinson.  They were invited to the 2019 CollegeInsider.com Postseason Tournament where they defeated Cornell in the first round before falling to Presbyterian College in the second round.

Roster

Schedule and results

|-
!colspan=12 style=| Non-conference regular season

|-
!colspan=12 style=| NEC regular season

|-
!colspan=12 style=| NEC tournament
|-

|-
!colspan=9 style=| NCAA tournament

Source

References

Robert Morris Colonials men's basketball seasons
Robert Morris
Robert Morris Colonials men's basketball team
Robert Morris Colonials men's basketball team